Marion Jean Catherine Adams-Acton (21 June 1846 – 11 October 1928) was a Scottish novelist. Most of her fiction was written under the pseudonym "Jeanie Hering".

Early life and education

She was born Marion Jean Catherine Hamilton at Brodick on the Isle of Arran on 21 June 1846, the illegitimate daughter of William, 11th Duke of Hamilton and a local island beauty, Elizabeth Hamilton. The Duke owned Brodick Castle, where one of his regular summer visitors was a popular landscape painter George Hering, son of one of London's most successful bookbinders, Charles Hering, Sr. George and his wife Caroline had lost their only child at the age of six and the Duke suggested that they adopt Marion. Her mother was reluctant but was persuaded that her daughter would get a much better start to life with this wealthy and well-connected couple.

They took her to London at around the age of four, returning to their house, Ormidale, on Arran in the summer months. In London she was known as Jeanie Hering, the name she later used for her children's books.  After receiving a good schooling to the age of sixteen she spent two years at a finishing school in Westphalia in Germany. After returning to London, the family were travelling to Arran by train for the summer when they were fortunate survivors of a train crash that killed hundreds.

Married life

The Herings' house in St John's Wood was in the midst of a thriving artistic community and it was no surprise that on 10 August 1875 Jeanie married an artist, John Adams-Acton, one of England's top sculptors.

Shortly after their marriage the couple took a tour across Europe to India where they spent several months in Bombay. When they returned they settled in a house in Marylebone. When both of her adopted parents died Marian inherited Ormidale, which she always visited for some time in the summer.

Around 1880 the couple moved to 14 Langford Place, St John's Wood; at that time the house was named "Sunnyside" and included the present numbers 12 and 16. During their time at Langford Place, Jeanie became a mother to seven children. The couple held numerous soirées and afternoon bazaars for friends and neighbours, and Sunnyside became a leading social centre for politicians and artists, including Sarah Bernhardt. John Adams-Acton was a close friend of William Ewart Gladstone, and Jeanie in 1884 organised a large charity event with Mrs Gladstone called "The Bee". By the 1890s Jeanie was socialising in the highest circles with kings, queens and prime ministers, and although she wrote plays, one of which was performed at the Strand Theatre, she wrote no more fiction.

She was looking for a new challenge in her life when her husband came home one day and announced that some friends had just walked from London to Dorset. Enamoured with this idea, she decided that the summer trip to Arran should be made that year on foot. Her husband quite reasonably objected on the grounds that his friends were just a couple, whereas she had six children, the youngest not even a year old; and of course Arran was considerably further than Dorset. The story of the journey became her last book, being published in 1894 as Adventures of a Perambulator.

In 1908 Adams-Acton incurred serious injuries when he was knocked over by a car; a lingering illness resulted in his death at Ormidale in 1910. He is commemorated by a memorial plaque at 14 Langford Place, unveiled on 19 July 1994.

Later life

All Jeanie's boys survived the war and she herself lived to the age of eighty-two, when she died in London on 11 October 1928; her body was removed to Brodick on Arran, where she was buried in a small churchyard.

Writings

Fiction

 Garry: a holiday story. : By Jeanie Hering. 1867. London
 "Little Pickles." A tale for children. : By Jeanie Hering. 1872. London
 Truth will out. A tale. 1873. London.
 Golden days. A tale of girls' school life in Germany. : By Jeanie Hering. 1873. London
 Through the mist. 1874. London 3 volumes.
 Honour and Glory, or hard to win. A book for boys. 1876.  London
 The child's delight A picture book for little children : By Jeanie Hering 1878. London
 The town mouse : By Jeanie Hering . 1880. London
 A banished monarch, and other stories. By Jeanie Hering. 1880. London, Paris and New York.
 "Wee Lammie" [1880]. London
 "Minnie's Dolls,"  [1880]. London
 "A Rough Diamond." A Christmas story. [1880]. London
 "Honour is my Guide,". 1886. London.
 Elf. A Tale. 1887. London.
 Put to the Test. A Tale. 1888. London.
 The Child's Delight. [1890]. London.
 Rosebud. 1891. London.

Non-fiction

 The dog picture book. 1880. London
 Pet Dogs. [1890].
 Doggie's Own Book. [1890]. London.
 Adventures of a perambulator. True details of a family history. 1894. London.

References

Sources and external links
 Pickering, Anna Victorian Sidelights. From the papers of the late Mrs. Adams-Acton. 1954. London. 288pp+ 8 leaves of plates.
Peiffer S. 'Acton, Marion Jean Catherine Adams- (1846–1928)', Oxford Dictionary of National Biography, (Oxford University Press; 2004)

Scottish children's writers
Scottish women dramatists and playwrights
Scottish travel writers
Victorian women writers
1846 births
1928 deaths
British women travel writers
20th-century Scottish women writers
19th-century Scottish writers
19th-century British women writers
19th-century British writers
19th-century Scottish dramatists and playwrights
20th-century Scottish dramatists and playwrights